Muhammad Hannan (born 12 January 1995) is a Malaysian male squash player who currently plays for the Malaysian national team at international competitions. He registered his highest career singles ranking of 156 in October 2015 during the 2015 PSA World Tour.

During the Tour One competition of the 2018 Malaysian Squash Tour, as a part of the 2018 PSA World Tour, he reached the semi-final round and lost to Syed Ali Mujtaba Shah Bokhari of Pakistan.

References

External links 
 
 

1995 births
Living people
Malaysian male squash players
Sportspeople from Kuala Lumpur